This is a list of diplomatic missions of Equatorial Guinea, excluding honorary consulates. Equatorial Guinea is a small Spanish-speaking West African country.

Africa 

 Luanda (Embassy)

 Yaoundé (Embassy)
 Ebolowa (Consulate General)
 Douala (Consulate)

 N'Djamena (Embassy)

 Brazzaville (Embassy)

 Cairo (Embassy)

 Addis Ababa (Embassy)

 Libreville (Embassy)

Accra (Embassy)

 Abidjan (Embassy)

 Rabat (Embassy)

 Maputo (Embassy)

 Abuja (Embassy)
 Calabar (Consulate)
 Lagos (Consulate)

 São Tomé (Embassy)

 Pretoria (Embassy)

 Tunis (Embassy)

Americas

 Brasília (Embassy)

 Havana (Embassy)

 Washington, D.C. (Embassy)
 Houston (Consulate-General)

 Caracas (Embassy)

Asia 

 Beijing (Embassy)

 New Delhi (Embassy)

 Tel Aviv (Embassy)

 Riyadh (Embassy)

 Ankara (Embassy)

Europe 

 Brussels (Embassy)

 Paris (Embassy)

 Berlin (Embassy)

 Rome (Embassy)

 Rome (Embassy)

 Lisbon (Embassy)

 Moscow (Embassy)

 Madrid (Embassy)
 Las Palmas de Gran Canaria (Consulate)

Multilateral organizations 
 African Union
Addis Ababa (Permanent Mission to the African Union)

Brussels (Mission to the European Union)

Geneva (Permanent Mission to the United Nations and other international organizations)
New York (Permanent Mission to the United Nations)

Paris (Permanent Mission to UNESCO)

Gallery

See also 

 Foreign relations of Equatorial Guinea

Notes

External links 

Ministry of Foreign Affairs of Equatorial Guinea
Embassy of Equatorial Guinea in London, United Kingdom

References

Equatorial Guinea
Diplomatic missions